The demography of Sweden is monitored by the Statistiska centralbyrån (Statistics Sweden). Sweden's population was 10,481,937 (May 2022), making it the 15th-most populous country in Europe after Czech Republic, the 10th-most populous member state of the European Union, and the 87th-most populous country in the world. The total fertility rate was rated at 1.66 in 2020, which is far below the replacement rate of 2.1.

The population exceeded 10 million for the first time on Friday, 20 January 2017. The three largest cities are Stockholm, Gothenburg and Malmö. Sweden's population has become much more ethnically, religiously and linguistically diverse over the past 70 years as a result of immigration. Every fourth (24.9%) resident in the country has a foreign background and every third (32.3%) has at least one parent born abroad. The most common foreign ancestry is Finnish.

Statistics Sweden projects a Swedish population of 12.6 million in 2070.

Population 

Demographic statistics according to the World Population Review.

One birth every 4 minutes
One death every 6 minutes
Net gain of one person every 8 minutes
One net migrant every 14 minutes

Cities 

Sweden has 17 cities with a population of over 100,000 people. Most of Sweden's population lives in Svealand and Götaland.

Fertility 

The total fertility rate is the number of children born per woman. It is based on fairly good data for the entire period. Sources: Our World In Data and Gapminder Foundation.

Life expectancy 
Sources: Our World In Data and the United Nations.

1751–1949

1950–2015

Source: UN World Population Prospects

Statistics 
Demographic statistics according to the CIA World Factbook, unless otherwise indicated.

Population
10,202,491 (July 2020 est.)

Age structure
0-14 years: 17.54% (male 904,957 /female 855,946)
15-24 years: 11.06% (male 573,595 /female 537,358)
25-54 years: 39.37% (male 2,005,422 /female 1,947,245)
55-64 years: 11.67% (male 588,314 /female 583,002)
65 years and over: 20.37% (male 946,170 /female 1,098,986) (2018 est.)

0-14 years: 17.43% (male 892,462/female 843,375)
15-24 years: 11.31% (male 581,025/female 545,971)
25-54 years: 39.42% (male 1,993,590/female 1,933,080)
55-64 years: 11.58% (male 578,942/female 574,479)
65 years and over: 20.26% (male 931,593/female 1,085,970) (2017 est.)

Median age
total: 41.1 years. Country comparison to the world: 45th
male: 40.1 years
female: 42.2 years (2018 est.)

total: 41.2 years
male: 40.2 years
female: 42.2 years (2017 est.)

Birth rate
12.1 births/1,000 population (2018 est.) Country comparison to the world: 164th
11.78 births/1,000 population (2013 est.)

Death rate
9.4 deaths/1,000 population (2017 est.) Country comparison to the world: 52nd
9.37 deaths/1,000 population (2013 est.)

Total fertility rate
1.87 children born/woman (2018 est.) Country comparison to the world: 141st

Net migration rate
5.3 migrant(s)/1,000 population (2017 est.) Country comparison to the world: 23rd
6.75 migrant(s)/1,000 population (2013 est.)

Population growth rate
0.8% (2018 est.) Country comparison to the world: 129th
0.81% (2017 est.)
0.93% (2013 est.)

Mother's mean age at first birth
29.1 years (2015 est.)

Life expectancy at birth
total population: 82.1 years (country comparison to the world: 16th)
male: 80.2 years
female: 84.2 years (2017 est.)

Net birth surplus rate
2.40 births/1,000 population (2013 est.)

Infant mortality rate
total: 2.6 deaths/1,000 live births Country comparison to the world: 218th
male: 2.9 deaths/1,000 live births
female: 2.3 deaths/1,000 live births (2017 est.)

2.75 deaths/1,000 live births (2010 est.)

Dependency ratios
total dependency ratio: 58.5
youth dependency ratio: 27.4
elderly dependency ratio: 31.1
potential support ratio: 3.2 (2015 est.)

Unemployment, youth ages 15–24
total: 17.9%. Country comparison to the world: 72nd
male: 18.8%
female: 17% (2017 est.)

School life expectancy (primary to tertiary education)
total: 19 years
male: 18 years
female: 20 years (2016)

Urbanisation
88% of total population (2020 est.)
Rate of urbanisation: 1.05% annual rate of change (2015–20 est.)

Population change 

The demography of Sweden is monitored by Statistics Sweden (SCB).

The 2005 Swedish census showed an increase of 475,322 compared to the 1990 census, an average increase of 31,680 annually. During the 1990s, birth rate increased by more than 100,000 children per year while death rates fell and immigration surged. In the early 2000s, birth rate declined as immigration increased further, with the context of unrest in the Middle East, upholding steady population growth.

Population projections
In 1950 Sweden had fewer people aged 10–20 with more people ages 20–30 and 0–10. In 2017 the ratio of male to female remains steady at about 50–50. As a whole, the graph broadens with people appearing to live longer. In 2050 it is predicted that all ages will increase from below 300,000 males and females to above 300,000 males and females. With about 50,000 people living to the ages of 90–100. In 2100 the graph is shaped as a rectangle with people of all ages and genders remaining steady. It narrows slightly at the top of the graph with about 250,000/300,000 males and females living to be 90–100 years old.
Statistics Sweden projects the following population development in Sweden:

Eurostat projects a population in Sweden reaching 11,994,364 people in 2040 and 14,388,478 in 2080.

Urbanisation and population density 

The population density is just over 25 people per km2 (65 per square mile), with 1,437 persons per km2 in localities (continuous settlement with at least 200 inhabitants)., 87% of the population live in urban areas, which cover 1.5% of the entire land area. 63% of Swedes are in large urban areas. The population density is substantially higher in the south than in the north.  The capital city Stockholm has a municipal population of about 950,000 (with 1.5 million in the urban area and 2.3 million in the metropolitan area). The second- and third-largest cities are Gothenburg and Malmö. Greater Gothenburg counts just over a million inhabitants and the same goes for the western part of Scania, along the Öresund. The Öresund Region, the Danish-Swedish cross-border region around the Öresund that Malmö is part of, has a population of 4 million. Outside of major cities, areas with notably higher population density include the agricultural part of Östergötland, the western coast, the area around Lake Mälaren and the agricultural area around Uppsala.

Norrland, which covers approximately 60% of the Swedish territory, has a very low population density (below 5 people per square kilometer). The mountains and most of the remote coastal areas are almost unpopulated. Low population density exists also in large parts of western Svealand, as well as southern and central Småland. An area known as Finnveden, which is located in the south-west of Småland, and mainly below the 57th parallel, can also be considered as almost empty of people.

Origin 

The majority of the population are ethnic Swedes, or people who can trace most of their ethnicity to Sweden going back at least 12 generations. The Sweden Finns are a large ethnic minority comprising approximately 50,000 along the Swedish-Finnish border, and 450,000 first and second-generation immigrated ethnic Finns, mainly living in the Mälaren Valley region. Meänkieli Finnish has official status in parts of northern Sweden near the Finnish border. In addition, Sweden's indigenous population groups include the Sami people, who have a history of practicing hunting and gathering and gradually adopting a largely semi-nomadic reindeer herding lifestyle. While the Sámi have lived in Fennoscandia from at earliest 3,500 years to at latest around 2,650 years, Sámi settlement of Scandinavia does not predate Norse/Scandinavian settlement of Scandinavia, as sometimes popularly assumed. The migration of Germanic-speaking peoples to Southern Scandinavia happened independently and separate from the later Sami migrations into the northern regions. Today, the Sami language holds the status of official minority language in the Norrbotten, Västerbotten and Jämtland counties.

In addition to the Sami, Tornedalers, and Sweden Finns, Jewish and Roma people have national minority status in Sweden.

There are no official statistics on ethnicity, but according to Statistics Sweden, around two million (19.6%) inhabitants in Sweden are born in another country. Of those, more than half are Swedish citizens. The most common countries of origin were Syria (1.82%), Finland (1.45%), Iraq (1.41%), Poland (0.91%), Iran (0.76%) and Somalia (0.67%). The average age in Sweden is 41.1 years.

There are at least two studies that forecast future demographic changes in Sweden largely due to immigration and low birth rates. A 2006 study states that "[based upon current data, extrapolated with relevant assumptions] Sweden and the Netherlands would have majority foreign-origin populations by the end of the [21st] century." A 2018 study concluded that in Sweden by "2065, the share of the native population is [set] to decrease to 49%, the Western population is projected to fall to 63%, and the Muslim population increase to 25%."  Thomas Lindh, at the time head researcher for the Swedish Institute for Futures Studies, claimed in an interview that by the year "2050, more than half of Sweden's population will be immigrants or second-generation immigrants."

Vital statistics 
Data according to Statistics Sweden, which collects the official statistics for Sweden.

In 2021 80,465 (70.4%) babies were born to Swedish-born mothers while 33,798 (29.6%) were born to foreign-born mothers. The total fertility rate for Swedish-born women was 1.62, for foreign-born ones 1.86.

Current vital statistics

Migration

Prior to World War II, emigrants generally outnumbered immigrants. Since then, net migration has been positive with many immigrants coming to Sweden from the 1970s through today.

Emigration

Between 1820 and 1930, approximately 1.3 million Swedes, a third of the country's population at the time, emigrated to North America, and most of them to the United States. There are more than 4.4 million Swedish Americans according to a 2006 US Census Bureau estimate. In Canada, the community of Swedish ancestry is 330,000 strong.

Immigration

The demographic profile of Sweden has altered considerably due to immigration patterns since the 1970s. As of 2020, Statistics Sweden reported that around 2,686,040 or 25.9% of the inhabitants of Sweden were from a foreign background: that is, each such person either had been born abroad or had been born in Sweden to two parents who themselves had both been born abroad. Also taking into account people with only one parent born abroad, this number increases to one third (33.5%).

Additionally, the birth rate among immigrant women after arriving in Sweden is somewhat higher than among ethnic Swedes. Taking into account the fact that immigrant women have on average fewer children than Swedish women of comparable age, however, the difference in total birth rate is only 0.1 children more if the woman is foreign born – with the disclaimer that some women may have children not immigrating to and not reported in Sweden, who are thus not included in the statistics.

Historical immigration
World War II
Immigration increased markedly with World War II. Historically, the most numerous of foreign born nationalities are ethnic Germans from Germany and other Scandinavians from Denmark and Norway. In short order, 70,000 war children were evacuated from Finland, of which 15,000 remained in Sweden. Also, many of Denmark's nearly 7,000 Jews who were evacuated to Sweden decided to remain there.

A sizable community from the Baltic States (Estonia, Latvia and Lithuania) arrived during the Second World War.

1945 to 1967
During the 1950s and 1960s, the recruitment of immigrant labour was an important factor of immigration. The Nordic countries signed a trade agreement in 1952, establishing a common labour market and free movement across borders. This migration within the Nordic countries, especially from Finland, was essential to create the tax-base required for the expansion of the strong public sector now characteristic of Scandinavia. but the influx gave rise to an anti-Finnish sentiment within Sweden and Norway.
This continued until 1967, when the labour market became saturated, and Sweden introduced new immigration controls.

On a smaller scale, Sweden took in political refugees from Hungary and the former Czechoslovakia after their countries were invaded by the Soviet Union in 1956 and 1968, respectively.

Contemporary immigration
Since the early 1970s, immigration to Sweden has been mostly due to refugee migration and family reunification from countries in the Middle East and Latin America.
According to Eurostat, in 2010, there were 1.33 million foreign-born residents in Sweden, corresponding to 14.3% of the total population. Of these, 859,000 (64.3%) were born outside the EU and 477,000 (35.7%) were born in another EU Member State.  By comparison, the Swedish civil registry reports, for 2018, that nearly 1.96 million residents are foreign-born, a 47% increase from 2010. There are 8.27 million Swedish-born residents, giving a total population of 10.23 million, and a 19.1% foreign-born population.

The first group of Assyrians/Syriacs moved to Sweden from Lebanon in 1967. Many of them live in Södertälje (Stockholm). There are also around 40,000 Roma in Sweden. Some Roma people have long historical roots in Sweden, while others are more recent migrants from elsewhere in Europe.

Immigrants from Western Asia have been a rapidly growing share of Sweden's population. According to the government agency Statistics Sweden, the number of immigrants born in all of Asia (including the Middle East) rose from just 1,000 in 1950 to 295,000 in 2003. Most of those immigrants came from Iraq, Iran, Lebanon and Syria, according to Statistics Sweden.

Immigration of Iraqis increased dramatically during the Iraq War, beginning in 2003. A total of 8,951 Iraqis came to Sweden in 2006, accounting for 45% of the entire Iraqi migration to Europe. By 2007, the community of Iraqis in Sweden numbered above 70,000. In 2008, Sweden introduced tighter rules on asylum seekers.

A significant number of Syrian Christians have also settled in Sweden. There have also been immigrants from South-Central Asia such as Afghanistan and India. Since the European migrant crisis, Syrians became the second-largest group of foreign-born persons in the Swedish civil registry in 2017 with 158,443 people (after former Yugoslavia).

Note that the table below lists the citizenship the person had when arriving in Sweden, and therefore there are no registered Eritreans, Russians or Bosnians from 1990, they were recorded as Ethiopians, Soviets and Yugoslavs. The nationality of Yugoslavs below is therefore people who came to Sweden from the Socialist Federal Republic of Yugoslavia before 1991 and people who came from today's Montenegro and Serbia before 2003, then called the Federal Republic of Yugoslavia. Counting all people who came from Slovenia, Croatia, Bosnia and Herzegovina, Serbia, Montenegro, Kosovo, Macedonia, Serbia and Montenegro, the Federal Republic of Yugoslavia and the Socialist Federal Republic of Yugoslavia, there were 176,033 people from there in 2018.

Language

The Swedish language is by far the dominating language in Sweden, and is used by the government administration. English is also widely spoken and is taught in public schools.

Since 1999, Sweden has five officially recognised minority languages: Sami, Meänkieli, Standard Finnish, Romani and Yiddish.

The Sami language, spoken by about 7,000 people in Sweden, may be used in government agencies, courts, preschools and nursing homes in the municipalities of Arjeplog, Gällivare, Jokkmokk and Kiruna and 

Similarly, Finnish and Meänkieli can be used in the municipalities of Gällivare, Haparanda, Kiruna, Pajala and Övertorneå and its immediate neighbourhood.
Finnish is also official language, along with Swedish, in the city of Eskilstuna.

During the mid to late 20th century, immigrant communities brought other languages, among others being Persian, Serbo-Croatian, Arabic and Neo-Aramaic.

Religion

The majority (56.4%) of the population belongs to the Church of Sweden, the Lutheran church that was disestablished as a state church in 2000. Until 1996, those who had family members in the church automatically became members at birth. Other Christian denominations in Sweden include the Roman Catholic Church (see Catholic Church of Sweden), several Orthodox churches in diaspora, Baptist, Pentecostal, Neo-pietistic (nyevangeliska) and other evangelical Christian churches (frikyrkor = 'free churches'). Shamanism persisted among the Sami people up until the 18th century, but no longer exists in its traditional form as most Sami today belong to the Lutheran church.

Jews were permitted to practice their religion in five Swedish cities in 1782, and have enjoyed full rights as citizens since 1870. The new Freedom of Religion Bill was passed in 1951, and former obstacles against Non-Lutherans working in schools and hospitals were removed. Further, that bill made it legal to leave any religious denomination, without entering another. There are also many Muslims, as well as a number of Buddhists and Baháʼís in Sweden, mainly as a result of 20th and 21st century immigration. There is also a small Zoroastrian community in Sweden.

See also
Statistics Sweden
Municipalities of Sweden
Demographical center of Sweden
Immigration to Europe
List of countries by immigrant population
Aging of Europe
List of Swedish counties by fertility rate

Notes

References

External links

Statistics Sweden – Official Database available in English